Pigeon Township may refer to:

 Pigeon Township, Baxter County, Arkansas, in Baxter County, Arkansas
 Pigeon Township, Vanderburgh County, Indiana
 Pigeon Township, Warrick County, Indiana
 Pigeon Township, Haywood County, North Carolina, in Haywood County, North Carolina

Township name disambiguation pages